The 1894 Delaware gubernatorial election was held on November 6, 1894. Incumbent Democratic Governor Robert J. Reynolds was barred from seeking a second term. Sussex County Clerk of the Peace Ebe W. Tunnell won the Democratic nomination to succeed Reynolds and faced businessman Joshua H. Marvil, the Republican nominee, in the general election. Though the Republican Party had long been dormant in the state, it had almost won the 1890 gubernatorial election. This year, Marvil narrowly defeated Tunnell, becoming the first Republican to win a gubernatorial election since 1862. However, Marvil's term as Governor did not last long; he died on April 8, 1895, elevating State Senate President William T. Watson to the governorship. Tunnell would later go on to be elected Governor in 1896.

General election

References

Bibliography
 Delaware Senate Journal, 85th General Assembly, 1st Reg. Sess. (1895).

1894
Delaware
Gubernatorial
November 1894 events